Judi Curtin (born c 1960s) is an Irish children's writer and novelist based in Limerick.

Biography
Judi Curtin was born in Kenton, London. When she was eight her family moved to Cork. She graduated with a degree in English and German from University College Cork. After completing her degree, Curtin trained as a primary school teacher in St Patrick's College, Drumcondra. She worked as a teacher for fifteen years. Curtin has lived in Cork, Dublin, Portlaoise and London but she is currently living in Limerick with her husband, cat and has three children. Curtin moved to Limerick in 1987. She began writing novels in 1999, and her first novel was published in 2003. She has since written for children beginning 2005. In 2017 Curtin won the Irish Book Award for Stand By Me.

Bibliography
 See If I Care with Roisin Meaney

Alice & Megan
 Alice & Megan's Cookbook
 Alice Next Door
 Alice Again
 Don't Ask Alice!
 Alice in the Middle
 Bonjour Alice
 Alice & Megan Forever
 Alice to the Rescue

Eva
 Eva's Journey
 Eva's Holiday
 Leave it to Eva
 Eva and the Hidden Diary

Lilly
 Lily at Lissadell
 Lily Steps Up
 Lily and the Lissadell Ghost

Friends Forever
 The Time Spell
 Double Trouble
 The Mystery Tour

References and sources

1960s births
21st-century Irish women writers
Writers from Limerick (city)
Irish children's writers
Irish women children's writers
Living people